Andy Murray was the defending champion, but lost in the third round to Mardy Fish.
Sam Querrey won in the final 7–6(7–3), 7–5 against Fish.

Seeds
The top eight seeds receive a bye into the second round.

Draw

Finals

Top half

Section 1

Section 2

Bottom half

Section 3

Section 4

References
Main draw
Qualifying Draw

Singles